U-34 may refer to one of the following German submarines:

 , was a Type U 31 submarine launched in 1914 and that served in the First World War; disappeared after 18 October 1918
 During the First World War, Germany also had these submarines with similar names:
 , a Type UB II submarine launched in 1915 and surrendered on 26 November 1918
 , a Type UC II submarine launched in 1916 and scuttled on 30 October 1918
 , a Type VIIA submarine that served in the Second World War until sunk on 5 August 1943
 , a Type 212 submarine of the Bundesmarine that was launched in 2006 and in active service

Submarines of Germany